Jóhann Laxdal (born 27 January 1990) is an Icelandic football player, currently playing for Icelandic football club Stjarnan. He's played over 100 games for Stjarnan since breaking into the first-team in 2007. His brother Daníel Laxdal also plays for Stjarnan. Daníel has played the most games for Stjarnan in the Icelandic top league as of 28 September 2013, 107 games, but Jóhann himself isn't far behind, as he's third with 101 games.

International career
On 14 August 2013 Jóhann played his first cap in a friendly against the Faroe Islands.

References

External links

1990 births
Living people
Johann Laxdal
Johann Laxdal
Association football defenders
Johann Laxdal
Johann Laxdal
Stjarnan players
Úrvalsdeild karla (football) players
Johann Laxdal